Southern Nights is a 1953 West German musical film directed by Robert A. Stemmle and starring Margit Saad,  Erwin Strahl and Waltraut Haas. It was shot at the Bavaria Studios in Munich with extensive location shooting in Italy. The film's sets were designed by the art director Karl Weber.

Partial cast
 Margit Saad as Gina
 Erwin Strahl as Renato
 Waltraut Haas as Eva
 Germaine Damar as Angela
 Walter Giller as Thomas
 Walter Müller as Harry
 Albert Florath as Buschmann
 Wilfried Seyferth as Zaccarella
 René Carol as Singender Gitarrist, Capri-Fischer
 Giovanna Cigoli as Mama Bianca
 Leonard Steckel as Giuseppe
 Alfred Pongratz as Zollbeamter

References

Bibliography 
 Bock, Hans-Michael & Bergfelder, Tim. The Concise Cinegraph: Encyclopaedia of German Cinema. Berghahn Books, 2009.

External links 
 

1953 films
1953 musical films
German musical films
West German films
1950s German-language films
Films directed by Robert A. Stemmle
Films set in Italy
German black-and-white films
1950s German films
Films shot at Bavaria Studios